Stuart Mudd (September 23, 1893, St. Louis, Missouri – March 6, 1975, Haverford, Pennsylvania) was an American physician and professor of microbiology. In 1945 he was the president of the American Society for Microbiology.

Biography
His father was the surgeon Harvey Gilmer Mudd (1857–1933). Stuart Mudd graduated in 1916 with a B.S. in biology from Princeton University and in 1918 with an A.M. from Washington University in St. Louis. At Harvard Medical School he graduated with an M.D. in  1920 and held a research fellowship in biophysics from 1920 to 1923. He was from 1923 to 1925 an associate at the Rockefeller Institute for Medical Research. At the University of Pennsylvania (UPenn), he was from 1925 to 1931 an associate in pathology at UPenn's Henry Phipps Institute, as well as an associate and assistant professor of experimental pathology at the University of Pennsylvania Medical School (UPenn Medical School, now named the Perelman School of Medicine at the University of Pennsylvania). In the microbiology department of the UPenn Medical School, he was an associate professor from 1931 to 1934 and a full professor from 1934 to 1959, when he retired as professor emeritus. From 1931 to 1959 he was the head of the department of microbiology. At the Veterans Administration Hospital in Philadelphia, he was from 1959 to 1975 the chief of the microbiological research program.

Mudd did research on a wide variety of topics, including phagocytosis, hemolytic streptococci, bacterial filtration, and electron microscopy of bacteria. During WW II, he worked on a method for freeze-drying of blood plasma, promoting an effective treatment for blood loss in wounded soldiers. He was the author or co-author of more than 275 scientific publications.

In 1952 he was the president of the Histochemical Society. From 1958 to 1962 he was the president of the International Association of Microbiological Societies. He was a founder and vice-president of the World Academy of Art and Science

In 1925 he was elected a Fellow of the American Association for the Advancement of Science. In 1944 his name was engraved on the Guggenheim Honor Cup of the Penn Club of New York. From 1976 to 1995 the Eastern Pennsylvania Branch of the American Society of Microbiology sponsored an annual Stuart Mudd Memorial Lecture.

In 1922 he married Emily Borie Hartshorne, who became in 1956 the first woman appointed to a full professorship at the UPenn Medical School. Upon his death in 1975, he was survived by his widow, two sons, two daughters, and six grandchildren.

Stuart Mudd, M.D. (1893–1975) should not be confused with his son, Stuart Harvey Mudd, M.D. (1927–2014), who was called S. Harvey Mudd and was noteworthy for his research on metabolic disorders.

Selected publications

Articles

Books

References

1893 births
1975 deaths
20th-century American physicians
American microbiologists
Princeton University alumni
Washington University in St. Louis alumni
Harvard Medical School alumni
Perelman School of Medicine at the University of Pennsylvania faculty
Fellows of the American Association for the Advancement of Science